Baiguo railway station is a railway station of Yichang−Wanzhou railway in Hubei, China.

Railway stations in Hubei
Railway stations in China opened in 2010